Sonneratia is an extinct genus of Cretaceous ammonites included in the family Hoplitidae. These fast-moving nektonic carnivores lived in the Cretaceous period, Aptian - Albian age.

Species

Sonneratia dutempleana (Orbigny, 1850)
 Sonneratia kitchini Spath, 1925
 Sonneratia rotator Casey, 1965

Distribution
Fossils of species within this genus have been found in the Cretaceous sediments of Canada, Denmark, France, Madagascar, United Kingdom and United States.

References

 Gayle Scott – Ammonites of the Genera Sonneratia and Douvilleiceras from the Cretaceous of Colombia

External links
 Ammonites

Hoplitidae
Ammonitida genera
Cretaceous ammonites
Ammonites of Europe
Prehistoric animals of Madagascar